The 1985–86 season was Kilmarnock's 84th in Scottish League Competitions.

Scottish First Division

Scottish League Cup

Second round

Scottish Cup

See also 
List of Kilmarnock F.C. seasons

References

External links 
Results for Season 1985/1986 in all competitions

Kilmarnock F.C. seasons
Kilmarnock